A pulpit altar or pulpit-altar is an altar in a church that is built together with a pulpit that is designed as an extension above the altar, so the pulpit, altar, and altarpiece form one unit. This type of altar is typical in a Baroque style church whereas earlier medieval churches and many more modern churches tend to have the more common free-standing pulpit that was set apart from the altar. This design became popular after the Protestant Reformation in Lutheran churches. It was first built to emphasize the importance of the sermon and the preaching of the Word of God in the worship service. It also symbolizes that the Word of God stands together with the sacraments (Holy Ccommunion) which takes place on the altar below. The first pulpit altars appeared in the German areas of Europe and in the baroque churches of the 1600s and 1700s. Sometimes the organ was placed above the pulpit as well to symbolize that music was also central to the church.

Germany
The oldest surviving pulpit altar is in the castle chapel of Wilhelmsburg Castle in Schmalkalden (today Thuringia), which was built under William IV, Landgrave of Hesse-Kassel in 1585–1590. Pulpit altars were quite popular in Upper Franconia, southern Lower Saxony, the Bergisches Land, and the Saxon duchies of today's state of Thuringia. The earliest verified example of a pulpit altar in the Thuringian area was built in the castle chapel of Callenberg Castle in Coburg (today Upper Franconia in Bavaria), built under Duke Johann Casimir of Saxe-Coburg and it was inaugurated in 1618. In the 19th century (in particular), a dispute broke out in the Protestant churches about the correct form and position of the altar. The Eisenach regulation of 1861 rejected the pulpit altar and required churches to have a free-standing arrangement of the altar in a sanctuary, bringing the design closer to the medieval Catholic setup of the chancel.

Norway
Many churches in Norway got pulpit altars during the second half of the 18th century and especially in the first three decades of the 19th century, several of these were later rebuilt or got an extra pulpit with a traditional placement. Pulpit altars can be seen in the Nykirken in Bergen (reconstruction 1756), Gamlebyen Church in Oslo (1796), Røros Church (1784), Kongsberg Church (1740–61), and Sør-Fron Church (1792). Pulpit altars were also used in the octagonal churches such as in Hadsel Church, Klæbu Church, and Tynset Church. The pulpit altar went out of fashion after a time, partly because the altar seemed to be subordinate to the pulpit. In Klæbu Church, a pulpit was later set up on the floor because of the priest's fear of heights. According to Hosar, there are at least 58 pulpit altars in Norwegian churches. In 1749, the old Hopen Church on Smøla was probably the first church in Norway to get a pulpit altar.

Media gallery

References

Church architecture
Altars
Altarpieces
Pulpits